The  is a board of education that mainly oversees public schools in Hokkaido, Japan.

The board directly oversees high schools and provides educational services in Hokkaido.

High schools

Okhotsk Subprefecture

Abashiri
 Abashiri Minami Gaoka High School 
 Abashiri Keiyo High School 
 Abashiri Special High School

Abashiri District
 Bihoro High School  (Bihoro)
 Memanbetsu High School  (Ōzora)
 Tsubetsu High School  (Tsubetsu)

Kitami
 Kitami Hokuto High School 
 Kitami Hakuyou High School 
 Kitami Ryokuryou High School 
 Kitami Commercial High School 
 Kitami Technical High School 
 Rubeshibe High School 
 Tokoro High School

Monbetsu
 Monbetsu High School 
 Monbetsu High School for the Physically Challenged 
 Monbetsu School for the Physically Challenged 
 Monbetsu Himawari Special School

Monbetsu District
 Ohmu High School  (Ōmu)
 Engaru High School  (Engaru)
 Okoppe High School  (Okoppe)
 Takinoue High School  (Takinoue)
 Yubetsu High School  (Kamiyubetsu)

Shari District
 Kiyosato High School  (Kiyosato)
 Koshimizu High School  (Koshimizu)
 Shari High School  (Shari)

Tokoro District
 Kunneppu High School  (Kunneppu)
 Oketo High School  (Oketo)
 Saroma High School  (Saroma)

Hidaka Subprefecture

Hidaka District
 Shizunai High School  (Shinhidaka)
 Shizunai Agricultural High School  (Shinhidaka)
 Shizunai Garden Branch Special School  (Shinhidaka)

Saru District
 Tomikawa High School  (Hidaka)
 Biratori High School  (Biratori)
 Biratori Special School  (Biratori)

Urakawa District
 Urakawa High School  (Urakawa)

Hiyama Subprefecture

Hiyama District
 Esashi High School  (Esashi)
 Kaminokuni High School  (Kaminokuni)

Kudō District
 Hiyamakita High School  (Setana)

Okushiri District
 Okushiri High School  (Okushiri)

Setana District
 Imakane High School  (Imakane)

Iburi Subprefecture

Abuta District
 Abuta High School  (Toyako)

Date
 Date High School 
 Date Midorigaoka High School 
 Date Special High School

Muroran
 Muroran Sakae High School 
 Muroran Shimizugaoka High School 
 Muroran Technical High School 
 Muroran Tosho High School 
 Muroran Special High School 
 High School of the Deaf in Muroran

Noboribetsu
 Noboribetsu Seiryo High School 
 Noboribetsu Akebi Secondary School

Shiraoi District
 Shiraoi East High School  (Shiraoi)

Tomakomai
 Tomakomai East High School 
 Tomakomai South High School 
 Tomakomai Sohgoh Keizai High School 
 Tomakomai Technical High School 
 Tomakomai West High School

Yūfutsu District
 Atsuma High School  (Atsuma)
 Hobetsu High School  (Mukawa)
 Mukawa High School  (Mukawa)
 Oiwake High School  (Abira)

Ishikari Subprefecture

Chitose
 Chitose High School 
 Chitose Hokuyo High School

Ebetsu
 Ebetsu High School 
 Nopporo High School 
 Ooasa High School

Eniwa
 Eniwa North High School 
 Eniwa South High School

Ishikari
 Ishikari South High School 
 Ishikari Shoyo High School

Ishikari District
 Tobetsu High School  (Tōbetsu)
 Shinshinotsu High School for Physically Handicapped and Mentally Retarded  (Shinshinotsu)

Kitahiroshima
 Kitahiroshima High School 
 Kitahiroshima West High School 
 Shirakaba High School for Physically Handicapped and Mentally Retarded 
 Sapporo Yougokyouei High School

Sapporo

Atsubetsu-ku
 Sapporo Atsubetsu High School 
 Sapporo Higashi Commercial High School 
 Sapporo Keisei High School

Chūō-ku
 Sapporo-Minami High School 
 Sapporo Nishi High School 
 Sapporo Needs School for the Visually impaired

Higashi-ku
 Sapporo Okadama High School 
 Sapporo Toryo High School 
 Sapporo Toho High School

Kita-ku
 Sapporo Hokuryou High School 
 Sapporo Intercultural and Technological High School 
 Sapporo Kita High School 
 Sapporo Eiai High School 
 Sapporo Technical High School 
 Yuho High School 
 Takuhoku Special High School 
 Sapporo School for The Deaf

Kiyota-ku
 Sapporo Hiraoka High School 
 Sapporo Shinei High School

Minami-ku
 Sapporo Nanryou High School 
 Sapporo Makomanai School for the Physically Challenged 
 Sapporo Yougomonami High School

Nishi-ku
 Sapporo Seiryo High School

Shiroishi-ku
 Sapporo Hakuryo High School 
 Sapporo East High School 
 Sapporo Shiroishi High School

Teine-ku
 Sapporo Asukaze High School 
 Sapporo Teine High School 
 Sapporo Touun High School 
 Sapporo Special High School 
 Hoshioki School for Special Needs 
 Teine Special High School

Toyohira-ku
 Sapporo Tsukisamu High School

Kamikawa Subprefecture

Asahikawa
 Asahikawa Agricultural High School 
 Asahikawa Commercial High School 
 Asahikawa East High School 
 Asahikawa North High School 
 Asahikawa South High School 
 Asahikawa West High School 
 Asahikawa Ryoun High School 
 Asahikawa Technical High School 
 Asahikawa Toei High School 
 Asahikawa Special School 
 Asahikawa School for the Blind 
 Asahikawa School For The Deaf

Furano
 Furano High School 
 Furano Ryuohoku High School

Kamikawa (Ishikari) District
 Biei High School  (Biei)
 Higashikawa High School  (Higashikawa)
 Kamikawa High School  (Kamikawa)
 Takasu High School  (Takasu)
 Special Dream School Higashikawa  (Higashikawa)
 Takasu Special School  (Takasu)

Kamikawa (Teshio) District
 Shimokawa Commercial High School  (Shimokawa)

Nakagawa (Teshio) District
 Hokkaido Bifuka High School  (Bifuka)
 Bifuka Special High School  (Bifuka)

Nayoro
 Nayoro High School 
 Nayoro industry High School

Shibetsu
 Shibetsu Shoun High School

Sorachi District
 Kamifurano High School  (Kamifurano)

Kushiro Subprefecture

Akkeshi District
 Akkeshi Shouyou High School  (Akkeshi)

Kawakami District
 Shibecha High School  (Shibecha)
 Teshikaga High School  (Teshikaga)

Kushiro
 Kushiro Commercial High School 
 Kushiro East High School 
 Kushiro Konan High School 
 Kushiro Koryo High School 
 Kushiro Meiki High School 
 Kushiro Technical High School 
 Akan High School 
 Kushiro Special High School

Shiranuka District
 Shiranuka High School  (Shiranuka)
 Shiranuka High School for the Physically Challenged  (Shiranuka)

Nemuro Subprefecture

Menashi District
 Rausu High School  (Rausu)

Nemuro
 Nemuro High School 
 Nemuro West High School

Notsuke District
 Betsukai High School  (Betsukai)

Shibetsu District
 Nakashibetsu High School  (Nakashibetsu)
 Shibetsu High School  (Shibetsu)
 Nakashibetsu Koyo High School  (Nakashibetsu)

Oshima Subprefecture

Futami District
 Kumaishi High School  (Yakumo)
 Yakumo High School  (Yakumo)
 Yakumo Special School  (Yakumo) (School for the Challenged)

Hakodate
 Hakodate Commercial High School 
 Hakodate Chubu High School 
 Hakodate Technical High School 
 Hakodate Nishi High School 
 Hakodate Ryohoku High School 
 Minamikayabe High School 
 Toi High School 
 Hakodate High School For the Blind 
 Hakodate High School for the Deaf 
 Goryoukakuyougo Special High School

Hokuto
 Kamiiso High School 
 Ono Agricultural High School 
 Hakodate Fishery High School 
 Nanae Yougo Ohima High School

Kameda District
 Nanae High School  (Nanae)
 Nanae High School for the Physically Challenged  (Nanae)

Hayabe District
 Mori High School  (Mori)

Matsumae District
 Fukushima Commercial High School  (Fukushima)
 Matsumae High School  (Matsumae)

Yamakoshi District
 Oshamambe High School  (Oshamambe)

Rumoi Subprefecture

Rumoi
 Rumoi High School 
 Rumoi Senbou High School

Rumoi District
 Obira Yougo High School  (Obira)

Teshio District
 Enbetsu Agricultural High School  (Enbetsu)
 Teshio High School  (Teshio)

Tomamae District
 Haboro High School  (Haboro)
 Tomamae Commercial High School  (Tomamae)

Shiribeshi Subprefecture

Abuta District
 Kutchan High School  (Kutchan)
 Kutchan Agricultural High School  (Kutchan)

Isoya District
 Rankoshi High School  (Rankoshi)

Iwanai District
 Iwanai High School  (Iwanai)
 Kyowa High School  (Kyowa)

Otaru
 Otaru Commercial High School 
 Otaru Chouryou High School 
 Otaru Fishery High School 
 Otaru Ouyou High School 
 Otaru Technical High School 
 Hokkaido High School for the Deaf

Suttsu District
 Suttsu High School

Yoichi District
 Yoichi Koushi High School  (Yoichi)
 Yoichi Special High School  (Yoichi)
 Yoichi Shiribeshi School for Physically and Mentally Handicapped  (Yoichi)

Sorachi Subprefecture

Ashibetsu
 Ashibetsu High School

Bibai
 Bibai Shoei High School 
 Bibai Seika High School 
 Bibai Special High School

Fukagawa
 Fukagawa East High School 
 Fukagawa West High School  (Nishi)

Iwamizawa
 Iwamizawa East High School 
 Iwamizawa West High School 
 Iwamizawa Agricultural High School 
 Iwamizawa Special High School

Kabato District
 Shintotsukawa Agricultural High School  (Shintotsukawa)
 Tsukigata High School  (Tsukigata)

Sorachi District
 Naie Commercial High School  (Naie)
 Nanporo High School  (Nanporo)
 Nanporo Special School  (Nanporo)

Sunagawa
 Sunagawa High School

Takikawa
 Takikawa High School 
 Takikawa Technical High School

Uryū District
 Uryuu Special High School  (Uryū)

Yubari
 Yubari High School 
 Yubari Special High School

Yūbari District
 Kuriyama High School  (Kuriyama)
 Naganuma High School  (Naganuma)

Sōya Subprefecture

Esashi District
 Esashi High School  (Esashi)
 Hamatonbetsu High School  (Hamatonbetsu)

Rebun District
 Rebun High School  (Rebun)

Rishiri District
 Rishiri High School  (Rishiri)

Teshio District
 Toyotomi High School  (Toyotomi)

Wakkanai
 Wakkanai High School 
 Wakkanai High School for the Physically Challenged

Tokachi Subprefecture

Ashoro District
 Ashoro High School  (Ashoro)

Hiro District
 Hiroo High School  (Hiro)
 Taiki High School  (Taiki)

Kamikawa District
 Shimizu High School  (Shimizu)
 Shintoku High School  (Shintoku)

Kasai District
 Memuro High School  (Memuro)
 Sarabetsu Agricultural High School  (Sarabetsu)
 Nakasatsunai Special High School  (Nakasatsunai)

Katō District
 Kamishihoro High School  (Kamishihoro)
 Otofuke High School  (Otofuke)
 Shikaoi High School  (Shikaoi)

Nakagawa District
 Honbetsu High School  (Honbetsu)
 Ikeda High School  (Ikeda)
 Makubetsu High School  (Makubetsu)

Obihiro
 Obihiro Agricultural High School 
 Obihiro Hakuyou High School 
 Obihiro Ryokuyou High School 
 Obihiro Sanjyo High School 
 Obihiro Technical High School 
 Obihiro Special High School 
 School for the Blind at Obihiro 
 Obihiro School for the Deaf

Service to support life-long learning
Citizen's College of Hokkaido(道民カレッジ) - An adult education service provided by Hokkaido Prefectural Board of Education

External links
 Hokkaido Prefectural Board of Education
 The Citizen's College of Hokkaido(Japanese)

Prefectural school systems in Japan
Education in Hokkaido